Abbeville is a city in and the county seat of Henry County, in the southeast part of Alabama, United States. It is part of the Dothan, Alabama Metropolitan Statistical Area. At the 2020 census, the population was 2,358. It is the first city alphabetically, both by city and state, in the Rand McNally Road Atlas. It has two high schools: the public Abbeville High School and private Abbeville Christian Academy. Chapters of the Red Cross and Habitat for Humanity operate here.

Geography
Abbeville is located at  (31.566367, -85.251300).

The city is located in southeastern Alabama along U.S. Route 431, Alabama State Route 10, and Alabama State Route 27. U.S. 431 runs from north to south along the western side of the city as a four-lane divided highway, leading north  to Eufaula and southwest  to Dothan. AL-10 runs from west to east through the center of town as Washington Street, and leads east  to the Georgia state line near Fort Gaines and northwest  to Blue Springs. AL-27 leads southwest from the city  to Ozark.

Climate
The climate in this area is characterized by hot, humid summers and generally mild to cool winters. According to the Köppen Climate Classification system, Abbeville has a humid subtropical climate, abbreviated "Cfa" on climate maps.

History
Abbeville is the oldest remaining colonial settlement in East Alabama from Florida to the Tennessee line. It is older than either the county of Henry or the State of Alabama. European Americans set up an active trading post in Abbeville in Alabama Territory early in 1819. The first settler gateway to the wiregrass region was at Franklin, located fourteen miles west of Abbeville.

Locals say that the name derives from the Muscogee name for Abbey Creek, Yatta Abba, meaning "dogwood tree grove.”

Abbeville was designated as the Henry County seat in 1833; the seat had previously been Columbia. It was formally incorporated in 1853.

20th century to present
Abbeville suffered a catastrophic tragedy that wiped out most of the town when an arsonist almost burned the whole town to the ground on May 20, 1906. An entire block of Kirkland Street, the major portion of the business district, was destroyed. The nearby courthouse was almost lost but was saved through the efforts of the “bucket brigade” firefighters, who kept pouring water on the flat roof. As is usually the case with disasters, some of the citizens made the unfortunate decision to take advantage by stealing items that were saved from the fire. During the week of June 28, 1906, a mechanic named Ward was arrested and charged with arson and starting the fire. His bond was set at $500.  After his bail was paid, Mr. Ward fled Abbeville and the county and was never heard from again. J. C. Espy and A. C. Crawford, who signed Mr. Ward’s bail bond, grudgingly paid the bail. The businessmen who had insurance recovered all or most of their losses. Unfortunately, some businessmen had no insurance. Nonetheless, the residents were determined to rebuild the downtown area. Brick buildings replaced the wooden structures that had been lost in the fire.

In February 1937, Wes Johnson, an 18-year-old African-American man, was accused of attacking a white woman and was arrested. He was abducted from the Henry County jail by a mob of 100 white men and lynched: shot and hanged to death. His body was found "bullet marked" and "swinging from a tree." As was typical of lynchings, none of the members of the mob was charged with a crime.  Faye Walker Howell, a resident of nearby Dothan, Alabama, has done research on this case for 20 years. She has documented that Johnson and the white woman had a consensual sexual relationship. The white men could not live with that, and lynched the young man. Howell was featured on 60 Minutes on April 8, 2018 during an episode featuring Oprah Winfrey touring the new National Memorial for Peace and Justice in Montgomery, Alabama. Johnson is among the lynching victims memorialized there. Henry County is noted as among the 805 counties where lynchings took place. It had a total of 13 lynchings during the decades when this was frequent.  In 1937 the Alabama Attorney General filed an impeachment against the Henry County sheriff for his failure to protect Johnson. An appeal was heard by the Alabama Supreme Court, which overturned the impeachment in June 1937. The Alabama Attorney General openly declared that Johnson was innocent of the charges against him.

In 1944, Recy Taylor, an African-American woman, was gang-raped by seven white men. Although the men admitted the rape to authorities, two grand juries subsequently declined to indict them. From a historic point of view, "the Recy Taylor case brought the building blocks of the Montgomery bus boycott together a decade earlier" than that event.

On November 5, 2002 Kirkland Street was hit by an F2 tornado.  The tornado destroyed several single-family homes, mobile homes and many other homes and businesses. The damage at the Abbeville High School was deemed too costly to repair and was rebuilt in a new location. Downed power lines and uprooted trees were numerous and widespread.  The Old Pioneer Cemetery was especially hard-hit. Tombstones were toppled, and eighty-year-old trees were uprooted in the Old Pioneer Cemetery.  Slabs on graves were cracked, revealing the vaults underneath. Restoration of the old cemetery took several years and several thousand dollars to complete.

Demographics

2020 census

As of the 2020 United States census, there were 2,358 people, 1,029 households, and 604 families residing in the city.

Abbeville

Abbeville first appeared on the 1850 U.S. Census. Although it did not report a separate population as a town from 1860–1880, it returned again in 1890 and has returned on every successive census to date. See also Abbeville precinct below, which includes the population of the city and surrounding area since 1860.

As of the census of 2000, there were 2,987 people, 1,172 households, and 787 families residing in the city. The racial makeup of the city was 56.65% White, 39.94% Black or African American, 0.07% Asian, 2.85% from other races, and 0.50% from two or more races. 3.52% of the population were Hispanic or Latino.

There were 1,172 households, out of which 27.2% had children under the age of 18 living with them, 45.8% were married couples living together, 17.8% had a female householder with no husband present, and 32.8% were non-families. 30.8% of all households were made up of individuals, and 17.4% had someone living alone who was 65 years of age or older. The average household size was 2.41 and the average family size was 3.01.

In the city, the population was spread out, with 22.9% under the age of 18, 8.4% from 18 to 24, 22.1% from 25 to 44, 22.8% from 45 to 64, and 23.8% who were 65 years of age or older. The median age was 42 years. For every 100 females, there were 82.6 males. For every 100 females age 18 and over, there were 78.2 males.

The median income for a household in the city was $23,266, and the median income for a family was $37,917. Males had a median income of $26,250 versus $20,603 for females. The per capita income for the city was $17,215. About 17.3% of families and 21.5% of the population were below the poverty line, including 21.1% of those under age 18 and 29.6% of those age 65 or over.

2010 Census
As of the census of 2010, there were 2,688 people, 1,077 households, and 699 families residing in the city. The racial makeup of the city was 54.4% White, 41.4% Black or African American, 1.0% Asian, 2.0% from other races, and 1.2% from two or more races. 3.1% of the population were Hispanic or Latino.

There were 1,077 households, out of which 24.9% had children under the age of 18 living with them, 41.1% were married couples living together, 19.1% had a female householder with no husband present, and 35.1% were non-families. 32.4% of all households were made up of individuals, and 16.3% had someone living alone who was 65 years of age or older. The average household size was 2.32 and the average family size was 2.94.

In the city, the population was spread out, with 22.0% under the age of 18, 7.5% from 18 to 24, 21.3% from 25 to 44, 25.5% from 45 to 64, and 23.7% who were 65 years of age or older. The median age was 44.3 years. For every 100 females, there were 85.1 males. For every 100 females age 18 and over, there were 93.1 males.

The median income for a household in the city was $28,533, and the median income for a family was $39,167. Males had a median income of $36,630 versus $25,302 for females. The per capita income for the city was $17,756. About 16.2% of families and 18.5% of the population were below the poverty line, including 25.2% of those under age 18 and 17.8% of those age 65 or over.

Abbeville Precinct/Division (1860-)

Abbeville, the 8th beat (precinct) of Henry County, first reported on the 1860 U.S. Census. In 1880, the number of the beat was changed to the 9th. In 1890, "beats" were changed to precincts and it continued to report as such until 1950. In the 1930 and 1940 censuses when racial demographics were reported, Abbeville precinct reported a Black majority in both instances. In 1960, Abbeville precinct was changed to census division as part of a general reorganization of counties.

Government
Abbeville is governed via a mayor-council government. The mayor is elected at-large. The city council consists of five members who are each elected from single-member districts.

Media 
Abbeville is served by one radio station, WESZ-LP.

Abbeville is served by a weekly newspaper, the Abbeville Herald, which has been in operation since 1915.

Education 
Abbeville is a part of the Henry County Public Schools system. It operates the Abbeville High School and the Abbeville Elementary School.

Abbeville Christian Academy is a private high school in the city and one of the last “unofficially” segregated high schools in the country.

Transportation
Intercity bus service is provided by Greyhound Lines.

Notable people

Leroy Cook, former defensive end for the Dallas Cowboys
 William Calvin Oates, Civil War and Spanish–American War veteran
Chris Porter, former Auburn University basketball player and professional basketball player
Al Richardson, former American football linebacker for the Atlanta Falcons
 Recy Taylor, an African-American woman activist whose rape in Abbeville by six white men was a catalyst for renewed actions of the nationwide Civil Rights Movement.
 Edward Vaughn, Black Power activist, bookstore owner, and member of the Michigan House of Representatives
Sharlene Newman, Cognitive Neuroscientist, AAAS Fellow

Gallery

References

External links

City of Abbeville, Alabama Official Website
City of Abbeville, Alabama Recreation Department

Cities in Alabama
Cities in Henry County, Alabama
County seats in Alabama
Dothan metropolitan area, Alabama